Route 455, or Highway 455, may refer to:

Canada
Manitoba Provincial Road 455
New Brunswick Route 455

Japan
 Japan National Route 455

United States
  Florida State Road 455
  Maryland Route 455 (former)
  Puerto Rico Highway 455
  Tennessee State Route 455
 Texas:
  Texas State Highway Loop 455
  Farm to Market Road 455